Euan Little (born 28 April 1976) is a Scottish professional golfer.

Career
Little turned professional in 1996 having represented Scotland as an amateur. Having reached the final stage of qualifying school that year, he played qualified for the Challenge Tour and played steadily at that level for the next five seasons, finishing runner-up twice, before claiming his first win in 2001 at the Segura Viudas Challenge de España. At the end of 2001 Little returned to the qualifying school and gained a place on the European Tour for 2002. After a difficult first season he returned successfully to the school in 2003, but once again failed to retain his status, despite recording a second Challenge Tour win, and returned to the Challenge Tour full-time for 2004. In recent years Little's form has slumped further, and he has made only occasional appearances on either tour since 2008.

Since 2009, Little has been the head professional at Dundrum House Golf Club in Ireland.

Amateur wins
1995 Scottish Youths Amateur Championship
1996 Scottish Youths Amateur Championship

Professional wins (2)

Challenge Tour wins (2)

Results in major championships

Note: Little only played in The Open Championship.
CUT = missed the half-way cut

References

External links

Scottish male golfers
European Tour golfers
Sportspeople from Dumfries
1976 births
Living people